Didier Poidyaliwane (15 March 1966 – 12 January 2022) was a New Caledonian politician. A pro-independence activist, he was a member of the Caledonian Union (UC) and the Kanak and Socialist National Liberation Front (FLNKS) and strongly defended the rights of indigenous Kanak people.

Biography

Education and professional career
Poidyaliwane was educated in agriculture at the Lycée d'enseignement professionnel agricole in Châtillon-sur-Seine, Metropolitan France. In 2008, he earned a master's degree in local development from the University of New Caledonia. In 2011, he became Deputy Director General of ADRAF.

Political career
An activist within the Caledonian Union, Poidyaliwane was elected to serve in the Government of New Caledonia on 31 August 2017, taking office on 1 December of that year under the leadership of non-independentist Philippe Germain.

While in government Poidyaliwane organized the development of a sustainable water policy alongside non-independentist Nicolas Metzdorf and held a conference in Nouméa. From this policy, the Mission interservices de l’eau was born, which aimed to continue to provide drinking water to all New Caledonians while preserving the island's natural resources. The mission also sought to eliminate New Caledonian consumption of untreated water by 2045 and improve the use of water in agriculture to achieve a food coverage rate of 50% by 2030. The plan was approved unanimously by the Congress of New Caledonia on 20 March 2019.

Personal life and death
Poidyaliwane died on 12 January 2022, at the age of 55.

References

1966 births
2022 deaths
New Caledonia politicians
Government ministers of New Caledonia
Caledonian Union politicians
Kanak and Socialist National Liberation Front politicians
People from North Province, New Caledonia